Such Is Life (Czech: Takový je život) is a 1930 Czech drama film directed by  and starring Vera Baranovskaya, Theodor Pištěk and .
The German director Carl Junghans was unable to secure funding in his native country, but eventually found an investor in Theodor Pištěk and the movie was made in Czechoslovakia.

Plot
The movie follows story of a washerwoman, her lazy husband and her daughter.

Cast
 Vera Baranovskaya as Washerwoman
 Theodor Pištěk as Washerwoman's husband
  as Washerwoman's daughter
 Wolfgang Zilzer as Washerwoman's daughter's boyfriend
 Jindřich Plachta as Seamster
 Manja Kellerová as Seamster's wife
 Eman Fiala as Pianist
 Valeska Gert as Waitress
 Uli Tridenskaya as Washerwoman's friend
 Betty Kysilková as Teller
 Edith Ledererová as Seamster's daughter
 Max Körner as Coal company owner

Reception 
The film was well received by critics and audience, however being a silent film in 1930 it couldn't compete with sound films and quickly disappeared from theatres.

Restoration 
For many years the film was considered lost. Only in 1959 the film was discovered, reconstructed by director Elmar Klos and new music was created by Zdeněk Liška. In 2016 the film was digitally restored by Czech Film Archive. The restored version was first shown at Il Cinema Ritrovato festival in Bologna on 29 June 2016.

References

External links 
 

1930 films
Czechoslovak drama films
Czech drama films
1930 drama films
Czech silent feature films
Czech black-and-white films
Social realism in film
Silent drama films
1930s Czech films